Hertig Hans slott ("Duke Hans' Castle") was the 1994 edition of Sveriges Radio's Christmas Calendar.

Plot
Duke Hans' castle is located on a rocky island out at sea. Construction was led by Duke Hans a long time ago. One day, his two descentendts Birger and Valdemar begin exploring the castle.

Rerun
The series was aired as a rerun between 4 February-7 March 1997.

References
 

1994 radio programme debuts
1994 radio programme endings
Fictional fortifications
Sveriges Radio's Christmas Calendar